Providence Township was a township in Bedford County, Pennsylvania.  The township was formed in 1780.  In 1854 the township split into East Providence and West Providence Townships.

Former townships in Pennsylvania